Syeda Momena Khatun was a princess of the Sultanate of Bengal's Hussain Shahi dynasty. She was the mother of Isa Khan, the leader of the Baro-Bhuiyan confederacy.

Biography
Khatun was born in the 16th-century into a ruling class Bengali Sunni Muslim family known as the Hussain Shahi dynasty, in the Bengal Sultanate. Her father, Sultan Ghiyasuddin Mahmud Shah, was the son of Alauddin Husain Shah – the founder of the dynasty. Her sister was the wife of Khidr Khan Surak.

She later married Sulaiman Khan né Kalidas Gazdani, who was her father's Dewan and the Zamindar of Sarail. According to historian M. Abdul Kader, Gazdani had fallen in love with Khatun prior to the marriage. In Sarail, she gave birth to two sons; Isa Khan, who would later become the leader of the Baro-Bhuiyan confederacy after the fall of the Sultanate, and Ismail Khan. She also had a daughter who was popularly known as Shahinsha Bibi.

See also
 History of Bengal

References

16th-century births
Year of birth unknown
Year of death unknown
Hussain Shahi dynasty
16th-century women
16th-century Bengalis
16th-century Indian Muslims
Bengali Muslims
Sunni Muslims